Aira Force is a waterfall in the English Lake District, in the civil parish of Matterdale and the county of Cumbria. The site of the waterfall is owned by the National Trust.

Description
One kilometre before entering the lake, the beck makes the  leap down a rocky and steep sided ravine at the falls known as Aira Force.

The river name Aira is derived from Old Norse eyrr, a gravel bank, and Old Norse á, a river, hence "the river at the gravel bank", a reference to Aira Point, a gravelly spit where the river enters Ullswater. The Old Norse word fors, waterfall, has been adopted into several northern English dialects and is widely used for waterfalls, with the English spelling 'Force'. Thus, "the waterfall on gravel-bank river".

Tourism

Aira Force lies on land owned by the National Trust. The Trust purchased the 750-acre Gowbarrow Park (on which the force lies) in 1906 and has provided facilities, such as car parking, disabled access, graded paths, and viewing platforms to make Aira Force one of the most famous and most visited waterfalls in the Lake District. The National Trust has also provided public lavatories and a café, and the site is open to visitors throughout the year. A public footpath from the village of Dockray passes the waterfall.

Beside the walk that passes up the glen is located a good example of a Wish Tree, in this case using a large fallen tree trunk. Visitors hammer coins into it using stones from the site.

In 2015, Ullswater 'Steamers' opened a jetty on the lake shore near Aira Force, making the waterfall accessible by foot passenger ferry from Glenridding. A footpath runs from Aira Force as far as Glencoyne Bay, but only a track exists from this point on.

Bridges
A small arched bridge spans the stream just as the beck goes over the falls giving views from the top. There is also a second bridge at the foot of the falls. Both bridges were constructed in honour of two members of the Spring family early in the 20th century. Cecil Spring Rice was the British ambassador to the USA during the First World War, while Stephen Spring Rice was a senior civil servant. The bridges are of particular interest: the lower is made of vertical stones, not traditional in this area of Cumbria, while the higher has horizontal stones, more in keeping with the dale customs. In 2021, the lower bridge was rendered inaccessible after a tree fall during heavy storms.

Poetry
The Lake Poet William Wordsworth paid many visits to the area around Aira Force; he was probably inspired to write his poem "Daffodils", with the opening line "I wandered lonely as a cloud", as he observed daffodils growing on the shore of Ullswater near where Aira Beck enters the lake near Glencoyne Bay. The falls themselves are mentioned in three Wordsworth poems, the most famous reference being in "The Somnambulist", where in the final verse he writes:

Letitia Elizabeth Landon's poetical illustration in Fisher's Drawing Room Scrap Book, 1834, Airey Force, to an engraving of a painting by Thomas Allom, refers to a legend that a hermit once lived beneath the falls.

References

External links

 Ullswater and Aira Force information at the National Trust
 Lake District Walks - Aira Force Waterfall
 Video on the Legend of Lady Emma and Sir Eglamore
 Video of the Aira Force Wish Tree
 Video footage of the Aira Force Pier
 Video of the Glenridding to Glencoyne Bay walk

Tourist attractions in Cumbria
National Trust properties in the Lake District
Waterfalls of Cumbria